Lauren Scala (born February 10, 1982) is a television reporter in New York City. She currently serves as a features reporter/host for WNBC's  daily lifestyle show "New York Live."  From 2010 until 2012, Lauren has been the host of WNBC's Live Interactive Trivia Game on the Saturday edition of Today in New York' during the 9am broadcast and from 2012 to 2021, she served as the traffic reporter on Today in New York.

She also currently hosts a half-hour show called "In the Wings," which is a backstage guide to everything Broadway that appears on NBC NY Nonstop and is an East Coast Entertainment Correspondent for EPIX.

Scala previously hosted several other half-hour shows for NBC's digital cable channel New York Nonstop, including Don't Miss This a collaboration with Time Out New York Magazine, "The Great American Health Challenge", New York City's first local fitness-themed reality competition show, and "Nonstop Sound," a show about music in the big apple.

She began her hosting career at Time Out New York On Demand, where she also worked as an associate producer on several hundred New York City based lifestyle video segments before the channel concluded. She was the co-host of  NYCTV's  entertainment news roundup City Scoop until January 2010.  She is also a member of the New York Women in Film and Television (NYWIFT).

In 2009, Scala hosted the official broadcast of the 52nd Annual New York Emmy Awards, which aired Thursday, April 9, 2009 on NYCTV, a division of NYC Media Group.

Prior to her on-air career, Lauren worked at Metro-Goldwyn-Mayer and DreamWorks Pictures in movie studio publicity and events.

Scala grew up in Mineola, New York and attended Mineola High School, as well as Fordham University.

References

External links
 Lauren Scala

American television reporters and correspondents
Fordham University alumni
1982 births
Living people
People from Mineola, New York
Journalists from New York City